Aquarius Records is a Croatian record label established in 1995 in Zagreb.

Signed artists include Barbara Munjas, Boris Štok, Eni Jurišić, General Woo, Kinoklub, Kraljevi ulice, Miach, Massimo Savić, Nola, Tony Cetinski, Šajeta, Viktor Vidović, Tamara Obrovac, Songkillers, Stoka, Nina Badrić, Lea Dekleva, Damir Urban, Cubismo and Silente.

References

External links

Croatian record labels
Record labels established in 1995
Companies based in Zagreb
1995 establishments in Croatia